Dubia is a plural of the Latin word dubium and may refer to:

 Dubia (butterfly), a genus of skipper butterflies in the subtribe Moncina
 Blaptica dubia, also known as the Dubia cockroach
 Nomen dubium (plural: Nomina dubia), in biology, scientific names that are of unknown or doubtful application